Northern Light is a 2006 Dutch film, directed by David Lammers set in Amsterdam-Noord.

Mitchell (also written Mitchel; Dai Carter) is a 15-year-old boy who lives with only his father Lucien (Raymond Thiry) since his mother and sister died in an accident. Mitchell finds a girlfriend Kiki (Melody Klaver). 

Mitchell is bullied by Lucien. Even though he is a teacher in a sports school, he teaches his students things like talking about things bothering them; however, he himself communicates very poorly with Mitchell. Mitchell provocatively shows up dancing in a ballet tutu  on his birthday party. Lucien freaks out and injures Mitchell. Mitchell goes in the tutu on his bike to some friends. They are not shocked about his tutu, they just wonder "Does your father know that nowadays you walk around like that?". Lucien starts living at his sports school. The film ends with a beginning of reconciliation: also they still hardly talk to each other, at least they drink coffee together.

Apart from the friction between Lucien and Mitchell the film shows a very friendly multicultural community.

Dai Carter is not planning to make more films; he wants to concentrate now on his career at the Air Force.

External links

https://web.archive.org/web/20060515200546/http://www.motelfilms.nl/film.php?id=34
https://www.variety.com/review/VE1117929751?categoryid=31&cs=1&s=h&p=0 

Dutch drama films
2006 films
2000s Dutch-language films